Gerard Plessers (born 30 March 1959) is a retired Belgian footballer.

During his career he played for R. Standard de Liège, Hamburger SV, KV Kortrijk, KRC Genk and KVV Overpelt Fabriek. He earned 13 caps for the Belgium national football team, and participated in the UEFA Euro 1980 and the 1982 FIFA World Cup.

Honours

Club 
Standard Liège

 Belgian First Division: 1981–82, 1982–83
 Belgian Cup: 1980–81
 Belgian Super Cup: 1981
 Belgian League Cup: 1975
 European Cup Winners' Cup: 1981–82 (runners-up)
 Intertoto Cup Group Winners: 1980, 1982, 1984

International 
Belgium

 UEFA European Championship: 1980 (runners-up)
 Belgian Sports Merit Award: 1980

References

External links
 

1959 births
Living people
Belgian footballers
Belgian expatriate footballers
Belgium international footballers
UEFA Euro 1980 players
1982 FIFA World Cup players
Standard Liège players
Hamburger SV players
K.R.C. Genk players
K.V. Kortrijk players
Lommel S.K. players
Belgian Pro League players
Bundesliga players
Belgian expatriate sportspeople in Germany
Expatriate footballers in Germany
People from Overpelt
K.V. Turnhout managers
Association football defenders
Belgian football managers
Footballers from Limburg (Belgium)